The 2021–22 Cymru North season (also known as the 2021–22 JD Cymru North season for sponsorship reasons) was the second season of the second-tier northern region football in Welsh football pyramid.  Teams were to play each other twice on a home and away basis.

Teams
The National League consisted of 16 clubs at the commencement of the season.

Team Changes

To Cymru North
Promoted from Mid Wales Football League Division 1
 Llanidloes Town

Promoted from Welsh Alliance League Division 1
 Holyhead Hotspur

Promoted from Welsh National League Division 1
 Holywell Town

Relegated from Cymru Premier
 Airbus UK Broughton

From Cymru North
Promoted to Cymru Premier
 Flint Town United

Relegated to Ardal NE
 Corwen
 Llanfair United

Relegated to Ardal NW
 Porthmadog

Stadia and Locations

 Due to COVID restrictions, Gresford Athletic were unable to play at their regular Clappers Lane ground at the beginning of the 2021–22 season. They shared grounds with Airbus UK Broughton at The Hollingsworth Group Stadium until September 2021, before moving to Cefn Druids' The Rock. They returned to Clappers Lane at the end of October.

Bangor City

On 18 February 2022 Bangor City announced in an official statement to inform the Football Association of Wales that they had withdrawn from the Cymru North for the remainder of the 2021–22 season. Later that day, the FAW confirmed that the club's withdrawal had been accepted and it's playing record in the league for the season had been expunged.  The club had been suspended from all football activity by the FAW since 30 November 2021 for non-payment of player and staff wages and had faced expulsion from the league by the FAW if it had not paid outstanding monies by 19 February.

Personnel and kits

Managerial changes

League table

Results

Season statistics

Top scorers

These totals are excluding goals scored against Bangor City, after their fixtures were declared null and void

Monthly awards

Fair Play award
The winner for each respective division's FAW Fair Play Table was to be given £1,000 prize money and the FAW Fair Play Trophy.

The winners of the Nationwide Building Society Fair Play Award for the 2021-2022 Cymru North season are Ruthin Town

References

External links
Football Association of Wales
Cymru North Football

2021–22 in Welsh football
Cymru North seasons
Wales